Embassy Tech Zone is a software-centric commercial park in Rajiv Gandhi Infotech Park, Marunji, Pune, Maharashtra. It spreads across 67.45 acres and is located off the Hinjawadi Phrase - 2. Out of the 67.45 acres, 42.30 of those acres are part of a Special economic zone, with plans of converting the remaining 18.03 acres into a Special economic zone as well. Embassy Tech Zone is the flagship project of the Embassy Group, or Embassy Property Developments Private Limited, a residential and commercial real estate group in India.

Location 

The Embassy Tech Zone is located in the Rajiv Gandhi Infotech Park, Marunji, Pune, Maharashtra.

Infrastructure 

The ETZ office complex has 6 office buildings Food Court and a sports zone along with a play school named Klay. It also houses major companies like IBM, Atos, MBRDI etc.

Community 

Energize is a community at the Embassy Tech Zone campus dedicated to conducting cultural, musical, community empowering initiatives or popular sporting events.

Occupancy 

The Embassy Tech Zone houses some of the top blue chip companies of the world and caters to a 15,000 strong workforce. Some of the tenants are MBRDI, IBM, HCL, Rockwell Automation, Access Healthcare Services Private Limited, EClerx, Flextronics Technologies, Nice Interactive Solutions, Nitor Infotech, Tech Mahindra, and Continuum Managed Solutions among others.

Awards 

 British Safety Council Sword of Honor 2017

References

External links 

 Embassy Office Parks

Software technology parks in Pune
Embassy Group